Still Hungry may refer to:

 Still Hungry (Twisted Sister album), a re-recording of the Twisted Sister album Stay Hungry
 Still Hungry (Ace album)
 Still Hungry (John Pinette album), a comedy performance released on CD and DVD by John Pinette
 'Still Hungry', the hidden track eight minutes in the song Can't Stop This on Sam Sparro's debut album, Sam Sparro

See also
 Stay Hungry (disambiguation)